The 1915 Southwestern Pirates football team represented Southwestern University as a member of the Southwest Conference (SWC) during the 1915 college football season. Led first-year head coach J. Burton Rix, Southwestern compiled an overall record of 4–3 with a mark of 0–2 in SWC play.

Schedule

References

Southwestern
Southwestern Pirates football seasons
Southwestern Pirates football